Zaw Win Lay (22 October 1963 – 3 October 2014) was the first Burmese chess grandmaster. He was also a four-time Myanmar National Chess Championship winner in 1990, 1995–1996 and 2007. One of his most notable matches was a draw against the former World champion Anatoly Karpov in 2000.

Zaw Win Lay died on 3 October 2014, leaving behind a wife and two daughters. In his memory, the Myanmar Chess Federation has held the GM Zaw Win Lay Memorial International Chess Tournament in Myanmar annually since 2014.

References

Chess grandmasters
Burmese chess players
1963 births
2014 deaths